Fidelity Special Values is an actively managed contrarian British investment trust that aims to achieve long-term capital growth predominantly through investments in UK-listed companies. Established in 1994, the company is a constituent of the FTSE 250 Index. The chairman is Andy Irvine. The fund is managed by Fidelity International.

References

External links
  Official site
 Fidelity Special Values
 FSV Fund Overview
 FSV Annual Report 

Investment trusts of the United Kingdom